The year 1973 was the 192nd year of the Rattanakosin Kingdom of Thailand. It was the 28th year in the reign of King Bhumibol Adulyadej (Rama IX), and is reckoned as year 2516 in the Buddhist Era. It most significantly marked by the 14 October uprising, which toppled the military government of Thanom Kittikachorn.

Incumbents
King: Bhumibol Adulyadej 
Crown Prince: Vajiralongkorn
Prime Minister: 
 until 14 October: Thanom Kittikachorn
 starting 14 October: Sanya Dharmasakti
Supreme Patriarch: 
until 7 December: Ariyavangsagatayana VI

 
Years of the 20th century in Thailand
Thailand
Thailand
1970s in Thailand